Purnomo Yusgiantoro (born 16 June 1951 in Semarang, Central Java) is an Indonesian politician, he is a former secretary-general of OPEC, former Indonesian Minister of Energy for three presidents, and former Minister of Defense in the Second United Indonesia Cabinet.

Early life and education
 Loyola College High School, Semarang  
 Engineering Degree, Bandung Institute of Technology (ITB), Indonesia, 1974 
Engineering Manager, PT BESSINDO, Jakarta, Indonesia 1979-1986
 MA. Economics, University of Colorado at Boulder Main Campus, Colorado, USA, 1988.
 MSc., Colorado School of Mines, Golden, Colorado, USA, 1986.
 Ph.D. Mineral/ Natural Resources Economics, Colorado School of Mines at Golden, Colorado, USA, 1988.
 National  Defense Institute (Lemhannas), Regular Course (KRA) XXV, First Rank Award Wibawa Seroja Nugraha, 1992.

Career
 Professor of Development Economics Atma Jaya University (2002 ) and Bandung Institute of Technology (2009).
 Chairman of  the ASEAN Defence Ministers Meeting (ADMM) (Era of President SBY ) 2011.
 Chairman of the Defence Industry Policy Committee (KKIP) (Era of President SBY), 2010-2014.
 Chairman of the Meeting on the ASEAN Economic Ministers (AMEM)on Energy (Era of President Megawati), 2004.
 Secretary General & President OPEC (Era of President Megawati ), 2001-2004.
 Vice Chairman of the Presidential Decree 133 - Restructuring of National Infrastructure (Era of President Gus Dur/Megawati), 2000-2004.
 Chairman of the Board of Pertamina Commissioners (DKPP)(Era of President Gus Dur/Megawati), 2000-2002.
 Deputy Governor of National Defense Institute (Era of President BJ Habibie), 1998-2000.
 Advisory/Special Staff of the Minister of Mines and Energy, Development Cabinet VI, 1993-1998.
 OPEC Governor, Vienna, Austria, from 1996 to 1998.
 Chairman of Working Group II for the Domestic and Foreign Marketing, Board of Pertamina Commissioners (DKPP), 1993-1998.
 Expert team of PAHs (Adhoc Committee) I, MPR Working Body in preparing the Guidelines Pelita VII, 1997-1998.
 Working Group of the National Security & Defense Council (Wanhankamnas), in preparing the Guidelines Pelita VII.
 Members of the Department of Mines and Energy Committee in Formulating the Guidelines Mining and Energy PELITA VII.
 Lecturer in various leadership courses : LEMHANNAS, SESKOGAB, SUSPIM Pertamina and PLN, SESPANAS, Defense Attache Course Dephankam.
 Chairman/Member of Indonesian Delegation in Multilateral Conferences : APEC, UNCTAD, UNDP, ESCAP, OPEC, Producers - Consumers, ASEAN,
 Chairman/Member of the Delegation of Indonesia Bilateral meeting: Australia, Japan, USA, Norway, South Korea, Taiwan, Canada .
 Consultants for Domestic/International on Natural Resources (NR), Economic Development and Financial Management.

Publications
 Many papers delivered in the sphere of economic development, micro-economic, energy and mineral resources, energy and environment, as well as defense and security 
 Authored the book: The Footprints of Time. 
 Together with another Authors: Indonesian Economic Analysis and Methodology (Editor DR. Syahrir) 
 Authored a book: International Financial Management. 
 Authored a book: Energy Economics: Theory and Practice. 
 Authored a book: The Indonesian Economy 
 Authored a book: Defence Economics: Theory and Practice

Award/Star Services/Signs of Honor
 Awarded 16 Star Services/Honors from the State (Republic of Indonesia) and Foreign Affairs, with the highest service star is a star Adipradana Mahaputra Services. 
 Awarded 15 Medals, from various institutions and organisations, domestic and abroad.

References
 Purnomo Yusgiantoro - Menteri Pemberani Tidak Populis

Notes

External links

1951 births
Government ministers of Indonesia
Living people
Indonesian Roman Catholics
Javanese people
People from Semarang
Secretaries General of OPEC
University of Colorado alumni
Defense ministers of Indonesia